Floribert N'Galula (born 7 March 1987) is a Belgian former footballer who played as a defender or defensive midfielder. He signed for Major League Soccer side D.C. United in the United States in January 2010, but was released from his contract just over a month later.

On 4 February 2011, N'Galula signed for the Finnish Veikkausliiga side TPS until the end of the 2011 season. On 4 August 2011, he signed a two-year deal with Belgian team Oud-Heverlee Leuven, but was released by the club already after the first season. In the summer of 2013, N'Galula signed for BX Brussels.

After retiring from football, N'Galula joined the coaching staff at Anderlecht under manager Vincent Kompany, with whom he played as a youngster at the club.

References

External links
Profile at dcunited.com

1987 births
Living people
Belgian footballers
Belgian people of Democratic Republic of the Congo descent
Association football defenders
R.S.C. Anderlecht players
Manchester United F.C. players
Randers FC players
Sparta Rotterdam players
D.C. United players
Turun Palloseura footballers
Oud-Heverlee Leuven players
Danish Superliga players
Belgian Pro League players
Veikkausliiga players
Belgian expatriate footballers
Expatriate men's footballers in Denmark
Expatriate footballers in the Netherlands
Expatriate soccer players in the United States
Expatriate footballers in Finland
Footballers from Brussels